Gu Cao (Chinese: 顾操; born 31 May 1988 in Shanghai) is a Chinese footballer who currently plays for Henan Jianye in the Chinese Super League.

Club career
Gu Cao started his football career with Shanghai Shenhua in the 2006 season.  
In February 2008, Gu transferred to fellow Chinese Super League side Henan Jianye after not getting any playing time while at Shanghai. He would eventually make his league debut for the club on 7 September 2008 against Changsha Ginde. After not playing much for Henan for several seasons as the club was relegated in the 2012 season, Gu cemented his place as one of the team's starting defenders in the 2013 season as the club won the second tier league title and was subsequently promoted to the top flight.

Career statistics 
Statistics accurate as of match played 11 July 2022.

Honours

Club
Henan Jianye
China League One: 2013

References

External links
 

1988 births
Living people
Chinese footballers
Footballers from Shanghai
Shanghai Shenhua F.C. players
Henan Songshan Longmen F.C. players
Chinese Super League players
China League One players
Association football defenders
21st-century Chinese people